Doug Morris (born November 23, 1938) is an American record executive. He is the current chairman of 12Tone Music Group. He previously served as chairman and CEO of the Universal Music Group from 1995 to 2011 and Sony Music Entertainment from 2011 to 2017.

Life and career
Born to Jewish parents, Morris grew up in Woodmere, Long Island, in New York state. His father, Walter Bernard Morris, was a lawyer and his mother was a ballet instructor. He is a graduate of Columbia University. He began a career in the music industry as a songwriter for Robert Mellin, Inc., a music publisher. In 1965, Morris produced the self-titled debut album by the now-legendary garage band The Barbarians, which spawned two hits singles: "Are You a Boy or Are You a Girl" and "Moulty", the latter of which Morris co-wrote. Morris wrote "Sweet Talkin' Guy", a 1966 hit for The Chiffons, and produced the hit "Smokin' In the Boys Room" (1973) for Brownsville Station. After joining Laurie Records as a songwriter and producer in 1965, Morris eventually became vice-president and general manager of the record label. He later started his own label, Big Tree Records, which was acquired by Atlantic Records in 1974, which led to Morris becoming president of Atco Records and an association with Warner Music.

Morris became president of Atlantic Records in 1980, and became co-chairman and co-CEO of the Atlantic Recording Group, alongside Ahmet Ertegun, in 1990.  Morris played an integral role in making Atlantic the leading company in the Warner Music Group. In 1994, Morris shifted to the position of president and chief operating officer of Warner Music U.S., and was soon named chairman. Morris lost an executive battle at Warner leading to his departure from Warner Music in 1995.

Career at Universal Music Group
Morris began working with MCA Records in July 1995 by forming a joint venture record label, which became Universal Records when Morris was appointed chairman and CEO of MCA Music Entertainment Group in November 1995. The company was renamed Universal Music Group the following year. He was honored with a star on the Hollywood Walk of Fame; his ceremony was held on January 26, 2010, at the corner of Hollywood and Vine.

Morris was heavily criticized by music journalists for his approach to streaming services, especially the infamous PressPlay.

Lucian Grainge replaced Morris as CEO on January 1, 2011, and later replaced him as chairman on March 9, 2011.

Sony Music Entertainment chairman and CEO
Morris became chairman and CEO of Sony Music Entertainment on July 1, 2011. After Morris' arrival, Sony Music restructured two of its label groups. The RCA/Jive Label Group had been split in half, being separated from the Jive Label Group. Peter Edge was promoted to CEO of the RCA Music Group. L.A. Reid became the chairman and CEO of Epic Records shortly after Morris' arrival. Some Jive artists have been moved to Epic while others have been moved to the RCA. In addition to splitting the RCA/Jive Label Group, the Columbia/Epic Label Group was also split. In October 2011 Morris announced that Mel Lewinter had been appointed executive vice president of Label Strategy at Sony Music. On April 1, 2017, he was replaced as CEO of Sony Music Entertainment by Rob Stringer, who was the CEO of Columbia Records.

12Tone Music Group
In 2018, Morris founded the label 12Tone Music Group under Warner Music Group. His first signing to the label was American rapper Anderson .Paak.

Founder of VEVO
Morris's progressive digital strategies led him to become the first media executive to monetize online music videos, essentially helping to create the music video-on-demand market online. And nowhere is this more apparent than with the success of VEVO.

As the founder (and former chairman) of VEVO, Morris partnered with Google chairman Eric Schmidt to launch the new premium music video and entertainment service in late 2009. Within its first month of launch, VEVO amassed an unprecedented 35 million unique viewers in the U.S., instantly making it the #1 music entertainment destination on the Web, according to comScore.

Motown: The Musical
In 2013, Morris served as co-producer and lead financier of the Broadway musical "Motown: The Musical". Based on the life story of legendary Motown founder Berry Gordy, and featuring classic songs from the Motown catalog, "Motown: The Musical" was nominated for four Tony Awards and was the top-selling new musical of the 2012–13 season.

Awards and leadership
Morris serves on the board of directors of CBS Corporation, The Robin Hood Foundation, The Cold Spring Harbor Laboratory, and The Rock -N- Roll Hall of Fame Foundation. In 2003, the National Academy of Recording Arts and Sciences (NARAS) awarded Morris with the President's Merit Award, honoring his consistent creative commitment to artistic and entrepreneurial excellence and longstanding support for the music and world communities.  In 2008, Morris was honored with City of Hope's Spirit of Life award, and in 2009, he received the NARAS Icons award as well as a star on the world-famous Hollywood Walk of Fame. In 2014, Morris was honored by the Songwriters Hall of Fame with the Howie Richmond Hitmaker Award in recognition of being a star maker in the music industry who has been responsible for a substantial number of hit songs. In 2015, he received an honorary doctorate from the Berklee College of Music in recognition of his achievements and influence in music, and for his enduring contributions to American and international culture.

References

External links
CEO Exchange biography on PBS
Vivendi Management Board Bio
"Universal's CEO Once Called iPod Users Thieves. Now He's Giving Songs Away", on Wired
Doug Morris biography from Sony Music
Guide to the Douglas Morris Collection

Living people
1938 births
20th-century American Jews
American music industry executives
American record producers
Columbia College (New York) alumni
Sony Music
MCA Records
21st-century American Jews